Christy Underwood Clark is an American politician. A member of the Democratic Party, Clark represented District 98 in the North Carolina House of Representatives from 2019 until 2021. She is a candidate for the same seat in the 2022 election.

Political career
Clark was first elected to represent District 98 in the North Carolina House of Representatives in 2018, unseating Republican incumbent John Bradford. She ran for re-election in 2020, but lost to Bradford in a rematch.

Clark previously was a member of the following committees:
 Agriculture
 Appropriations, Capital
 Environment
 Judiciary
 Judiciary Subcommittee on Criminal Matters
 Regulatory Reform

Electoral history

2020

2018

References

Living people
Year of birth missing (living people)
People from Roanoke, Virginia
People from Huntersville, North Carolina
Roanoke College alumni
21st-century American politicians
Democratic Party members of the North Carolina House of Representatives